Tygart Lake State Park sits on  along the shores of Tygart Lake in Taylor County near Grafton, West Virginia, United States.

Facilities

 20-room Tygart Lake Lodge
 Lodge restaurant
 2 gift shops
 11 cabins
 40 camp sites (10 with electric hookup)
 Hiking trails 
 Boating
 Fishing
 Marina with boat rentals
 Waterskiing
 Swimming
 Picnic area

See also

List of West Virginia state parks
state park

References

External links

Campgrounds in West Virginia
Protected areas established in 1945
Protected areas of Taylor County, West Virginia
State parks of West Virginia
IUCN Category III